Rocke is  a surname. Notable people with the surname include:

Charles Rocke, English first-class cricketer
Colin Rocke, Trinidad-American association footballer
Lisa Rocke, German swimmer 
Samuel Rocke, Australian politician

See also
Rock (surname)
Roque (surname)